The 1991–92 Delaware Fightin' Blue Hens men's basketball team represented the University of Delaware during the 1991–92 NCAA Division I men's basketball season. The Fightin' Blue Hens, led by seventh-year head coach Steve Steinwedel, played their home games at the Delaware Field House and were members of the North Atlantic Conference. They finished the season 27–4, 14–0 in NAC play to win the conference regular season championship. They were also champions of the NAC tournament to earn an automatic bid to the NCAA tournament – the first appearance in school history – where they lost in the opening round to eventual Final Four participant Cincinnati.

Roster

Schedule and results

|-
!colspan=9 style=| Regular season

|-
!colspan=9 style=| NAC tournament

|-
!colspan=9 style=| NCAA tournament

References

Delaware Fightin' Blue Hens men's basketball seasons
Delaware
Delaware
Fight
Fight